Matthew Ricketts (born 1986) is a Canadian composer of contemporary classical music. He is a 2019 Guggenheim Fellow as well as the recipient of the 2020 Charles Ives Fellowship from the American Academy of Arts and Letters, the 2016 Jacob Druckman Prize from the Aspen Music Festival, the 2015 Salvatore Martirano Memorial Composition Award, a 2013 ASCAP Foundation Morton Gould Young Composer Award, and eight prizes in the SOCAN Foundation's Awards for Young Composers. He lives in Brooklyn, New York.

Biography 
Matthew Ricketts was born in Victoria, British Columbia. He attended McGill University’s Schulich School of Music, where he studied composition with Chris Harman, Brian Cherney, and John Rea. He earned a doctorate in music composition from Columbia University, where he studied with George Lewis and Fred Lerdahl. He is currently a Core Lecturer at Columbia.

Ricketts's music has been performed by the Aspen Philharmonic Orchestra, Esprit Orchestra, the Minnesota Orchestra and the Montreal Symphony Orchestra, as well as by ensembles and soloists including JACK Quartet, Quatuor Bozzini, the Chiara String Quartet, FLUX Quartet, soprano Tony Arnold, and the Nouvel Ensemble Moderne (NEM). He was Composer-Collaborator-In-Residence at East Carolina University from 2016 to 2018.

In May 2017, the opening of Ricketts’s Highest Light, a Montreal Symphony Orchestra commission, was performed by French astronaut Thomas Pesquet aboard the International Space Station, in a live broadcast during the world premiere performance in Montreal.

Ricketts's chamber opera Chaakapesh: The Trickster's Quest, with a libretto in Cree by Indigenous Canadian playwright Tomson Highway, premiered in September 2018 as the opening of the Montreal Symphony Orchestra's 85th season, and was followed by a tour of indigenous communities in Northern Quebec. The tour was documented in the 2019 film Chaakapesh.

Other works 
Ricketts is also active as a writer, librettist, and poet. His operatic collaboration with composer Thierry Tidrow, Less Truth More Telling, was produced in 2013 by the Dutch National Opera and the Royal Conservatory of The Hague.

Selected works

Orchestral 
 Adrift (2020) for clarinet and orchestra
 Halo (2019) for two trombones and orchestra
 Méloscuro (2018) for piano and orchestra
 Blood Line (2017) for orchestra
 Melodia (2017) for piano and orchestra
 Flat Line (2016) version for orchestra

Chamber 
 Ember (2019) for string quartet
 Melodia (2016-2017) for piano solo
 Highest Light (2016) for organ solo
 In Partial View (2015) for string quartet
 Flat Line (2014) for chamber ensemble of 15 players
 Enclosed Position (2014) for alto flute, clarinet, string trio and piano
 After Nine (2014) revised version for chamber ensemble
 Winter Line (2013) for chamber ensemble of 14 players
 Burrowed Time (2012) for chamber ensemble of 15 musicians
 Still Burning (2011) for bassoon, bass trio, percussion and piano
 Trio (2011) for clarinet, viola and piano
 Graffiti Songs (2010) for flute, violin, cello and piano
 Double Concerto (2007) for flute, clarinet and chamber ensemble

Vocal 
 Chaakapesh: The Trickster's Quest (2018) opera in three scenes for orchestra, two singers and narrator 
 Unset (2017) for soprano and chamber ensemble
 Fälscherlieder (2016) for six voices and four instruments
 Song Cycle (2015) for soprano and chamber ensemble
 Swallow Songs (2014) for high soprano and piano 
 Women Well Met (2013) for vocal sextet
 No Masque for Good Measure (2012) opera in three acts for four voices and four instruments

Selected awards and grants 
 2020 Civitella Ranieri Fellowship
 2020 Charles Ives Fellowship in Music from the American Academy of Arts and Letters
 2019 Guggenheim Fellowship
 2019 MacDowell Colony Fellowship
 2016 Jacob Druckman Prize (Aspen Music Festival and School)
 2015 Salvatore Martirano Memorial Composition Award for Flat Line (first prize)
 2013 ASCAP Foundation Morton Gould Young Composer Awards for Burrowed Time

References 

1986 births
21st-century Canadian composers
21st-century Canadian male musicians
21st-century classical composers
Canadian classical composers
Canadian male classical composers
Columbia University alumni
LGBT classical composers
Living people
McGill University School of Music alumni
Musicians from Victoria, British Columbia